Gaetano "Tommy" DeVito (June 19, 1928 – September 21, 2020) was an American musician and singer, best known as a founding member, vocalist, and lead guitarist of rock band the Four Seasons.

Early years
DeVito was born in Belleville, New Jersey, United States, the youngest of nine children in an Italian-American family. At eight years old, he taught himself to play his brother's guitar by listening to country music on the radio. By the time he was 12, he was playing for tips in neighborhood taverns. He quit school after the eighth grade. (Belleville High made him an honorary graduate in 2007.) By 16, he had his own R&B band and was making $20 or $25 a night.

Career
DeVito's musical career began in the early 1950s when he formed "the Variety Trio" with his brother Nick DeVito and Hank Majewski. This core group performed under various names and changing lineups. The band expanded to a quartet and changed its name to "the Variatones" including the addition in 1954 of singer Francis Castelluccio (later known as Frankie Valli). When they were signed to a recording contract with RCA Victor, in 1956, the quartet of DeVito/DeVito/Hank Majewski/Valli had renamed themselves "the Four Lovers". Tommy and Frankie remained the only consistent members of the Four Lovers, as the group released seven singles and one album under the Four Lovers name. Their 1956 debut single, Otis Blackwell's "You're the Apple of My Eye", achieved enough national sales to appear as a minor hit on the Billboard Hot 100 singles chart. The single landed Tommy his first national television appearance, when the Four Lovers appeared on The Ed Sullivan Show in 1956.

While his brother Nick left the group, Tommy DeVito continued his musical pursuits, reforming and realigning the group. He was close friends with Joe Pesci, who introduced DeVito and Valli to Bob Gaudio. By 1960 The Four Lovers consisted of DeVito and Valli along with lyricist/singer/keyboardist Bob Gaudio and vocal arranger Nick Massi, and were mainly used as a backup band for producer Bob Crewe under contract. This is the lineup which adopted the name "The Four Seasons" (actually, they were billed numerically as the 4 Seasons), named after a bowling alley in Union, New Jersey, that had a lounge where they had auditioned. Signed by songwriter/producer Bob Crewe, the Four Seasons cut their first single under that name, "Bermuda", in November 1961. It was released by Gone Records, but did not succeed. Their next single did, in 1962 Gaudio's composition No. 1 single "Sherry". Released by Vee-Jay Records in July 1962, "Sherry" hit number one in September, the first of three consecutive chart-topping hits by the Four Seasons, the others being "Big Girls Don't Cry" and "Walk Like a Man".

Massi left the group in 1965, just before the release of "Let's Hang On!", and arranger Charles Calello played bass until a new bass player could be found, and then Joe Long joined the band and participated on many chart topping hits for the remainder of the decade and into the mid-1970s. DeVito left the group in April 1970 before the album Half and Half was released. He told the Las Vegas Review-Journal in 2009, "I had had it up to here with the traveling and changing clothes three times a day, and taking two planes and then driving 100 miles to do a date. Getting on stage and doing the same stuff—I just had it." On the last song of this album, "Oh Happy Day, Any Day Now", DeVito can be heard playing a bit of a solo on his guitar. He sold Valli and Gaudio his rights to the Four Seasons' material, name, and touring act upon leaving in 1970. The reason for his departure was originally indicated as a hearing problem, but it was later revealed that he had accrued significant debt and financial trouble through gambling.

DeVito later explained that he had grown tired with the traveling demands, and in 1970 he moved to Las Vegas where several siblings lived at the time.  He started a new life, and became a card dealer for a time.  Times were tough for him for a while, as he discussed in a 2009 interview with Doug Elfman in the Las Vegas Review-Journal. DeVito, along with fellow original Four Seasons Valli, Massi, and Gaudio, was inducted into the Rock and Roll Hall of Fame in 1990 and the Vocal Group Hall of Fame in 1999. DeVito rejoined Valli and Gaudio (Massi had died in 2000) on stage at the 2005 Broadway opening of the documentary-style musical Jersey Boys, a Tony Award winning hit chronicling the story of the group's early days, which was later adapted to a 2014 feature film directed by Clint Eastwood.

Death
DeVito died  in Las Vegas on September 21, 2020, at the age of 92. His death was announced on Facebook by his friend, actor Alfred Nittoli, who stated that DeVito had recently been hospitalized after contracting COVID-19 during the COVID-19 pandemic in Nevada.

References

External links
 
 
 

1928 births
2020 deaths
20th-century American guitarists
20th-century American male musicians
American male guitarists
American male pop singers
American people of Italian descent
American rock guitarists
American rock singers
Belleville High School (New Jersey) alumni
Deaths from the COVID-19 pandemic in Nevada
Guitarists from New Jersey
Jersey Shore musicians
Musicians from Newark, New Jersey
People from Belleville, New Jersey
The Four Seasons (band) members